Phassus tesselatus is a moth of the family Hepialidae. The type location is listed as New Holland.

References

Moths described in 1854
Hepialidae